|}

The Ballycorus Stakes is a Group 3 flat horse race in Ireland open to thoroughbreds aged three years or older. It is run at Leopardstown over a distance of 7 furlongs (1,408 metres), and it is scheduled to take place each year in mid June.

The event was restricted to three-year-old fillies in 1977, and its present format was introduced the following year. For a period it was classed at Listed level, and it was promoted to Group 3 status in 1995.

Records
Most successful horse since 1977 (3 wins):
 Tumbleweed Ridge – 1998, 1999, 2000

Leading jockey since 1977 (8 wins):
 Michael Kinane – Seasonal Pickup (1985), Innsbruck (1986), Cipriani (1988), Milieu (1989), Additional Risk (1991), Pre-Eminent (1992), King Charlemagne (2001), Lord Admiral (2007)

Leading trainer since 1977 (9 wins):
 Dermot Weld – Gayshuka (1977), Hot Princess (1983), Seasonal Pickup (1985), Innsbruck (1986), Cipriani (1988), Milieu (1989), Additional Risk (1991), Pre-Eminent (1992), Rum Charger (2002)

Winners since 1977

See also
 Horse racing in Ireland
 List of Irish flat horse races

References
 Paris-Turf:

 Racing Post:

 galopp-sieger.de – Ballycorus Stakes.
 ifhaonline.org – International Federation of Horseracing Authorities – Ballycorus Stakes (2019).
 irishracinggreats.com – Ballycorus Stakes (Group 3).
 pedigreequery.com – Ballycorus Stakes – Leopardstown.

Flat races in Ireland
Open mile category horse races
Leopardstown Racecourse